Feira Grande is a municipality located in the western region of the Brazilian state of Alagoas.

References

municipalities in Alagoas